Fare tax may refer to:
 FairTax, a tax reform proposal in the United States
 Fare paid for taxicabs or on other public transport
 Taxes on airfare by an airline or an airport